James Field Stanfield (1749 – 10 May 1824) was an Irish actor, abolitionist and author. He was the father of the English painter Clarkson Stanfield.

Life
Stanfield was educated in France for the Roman Catholic priesthood. He did not take orders, but went to sea in a vessel engaged in the Atlantic slave trade. After a bad time at sea and a short period on shore in Africa, he returned to England, one out of three survivors of the voyage.

Joining a theatrical company, Stanfield appeared in 1786 at York, where he also tried his hand at writing a comic opera. Joining the abolitionists, he found friends including Thomas Clarkson. For several years he held a principal situation in the Scarborough Theatre, and he afterwards had the direction of a small company whose circuit (about 1812) was in the north of Yorkshire and some of the adjoining counties.

On 13 June 1793 James Field Stanfield joined the Sea Captain Lodge, Sunderland, which later became Palatine Lodge No. 97.

He died in London, aged 74.

Works
In 1788 Stanfield published an account of his experience of the slave trade in Observations on a Guinea Voyage in a series of letters addressed to the Rev. Thomas Clarkson, and in the following year a poem, The Guinea Voyage (London). In 1807 both works were published at Edinburgh in one volume.  In 1813 he published an Essay on the Study and Composition of Biography (Sunderland), insisting on the need of "moral illustration".

Family
Stanfield was twice married, and was a father by his first wife, Mary Hoad (died 1801) of Cheltenham, of the English painter Clarkson Frederick Stanfield.

Notes

External links
 
 

Attribution
 

Date of birth missing
1749 births
1824 deaths
18th-century Irish male actors
19th-century Irish male actors
Irish abolitionists
Irish poets
Irish male stage actors
Irish emigrants to Great Britain